Richard Frank Icasiano Gomez (born April 7, 1966) is a Filipino actor, television presenter and director, politician, and épée fencer. He has been serving as the Representative of Leyte's 4th district since 2022, and was mayor of Ormoc from 2016 to 2022.

Gomez was a leading actor in the early 1990s, earning several awards and nominations. He played the title character in Super Islaw and The Flying Kids (1986) and appeared in the romantic drama films Nagbabagang Luha and Babaing Hampaslupa (both 1988), and starred in Hihintayin Kita sa Langit (1991) opposite Dawn Zulueta. From 1987 to 1998, he co-starred in the ABS-CBN sitcom Palibhasa Lalake alongside John Estrada and Joey Marquez. In 1998, he married actress Lucy Torres, who later also became a politician. The couple starred in the ABS-CBN sitcom Richard Loves Lucy from 1998 to 2001. He was then part of the main casts of Mano Po (2002) and The Trial (2014), and appeared in the GMA sitcom Lagot Ka, Isusumbong Kita (2003–2007), and teleseryes Captain Barbell (2006–2007), Marimar (2007–2008), and Codename: Asero (2008). He was paired again with Zulueta in Walang Hanggan (2012), The Love Affair (2015), and You're My Home (2015–2016). He also co-hosted the talk show S-Files (2002–2007), and presented the Philippine version of Family Feud (2008–2009).

In politics, Gomez had an unsuccessful start. His party was disqualified in the 2001 House of Representatives elections, and he then lost in the 2007 Senate election. He moved to his wife's hometown of Ormoc to run for the local House seat in 2010 but was disqualified for failing to establish residency. In 2013, he lost the mayoral election but won in 2016 and was re-elected in 2019. In fencing, he was a member of the Philippines team that won gold in the team men's épée event at the 2005 Southeast Asian Games. He is also serving as president of the Philippine Fencing Association (PFA) since 2016.

Biography and entertainment career
He is the only child of race car driver Eddie Kelly Gomez and Josephine Icasiano (also known as, Stella Suarez), an actress in the 1960s. His cousin is Stella Suarez Jr. (also known as, Pinky Suarez) who was adopted by his parents and raised as his sibling. He was raised by his grandmother after his parents separated.

He was working at McDonald's when he was discovered by his late talent manager Douglas Quijano. He then became one of the faces of Bench, a Philippine clothing brand. He debuted in acting in the 1984 movie Hindi Mo Ako Kayang Tapakan.

In 1998, he married Lucy Torres with whom he has a daughter. In 2002, he transferred to GMA network with his first melodrama show, Ang Iibigin ay Ikaw and its sequel Ang Iibigin ay Ikaw Pa Rin as well as presenting S-Files. His first GMA sitcom was Lagot Ka, Isusumbong Kita which aired from 2003 to 2007.

He was a gold medalist in fencing at the 2005 Southeast Asian Games, and was elected president of the Philippine Fencing Association (PFA) in 2016; he was re-elected in 2021. He is an organizer for "Goma Cup" and MAD (Mamamayan Ayaw sa Droga), a campaign against use of illegal drugs. He became one of the owners of "FELIX", a restaurant in Greenbelt 5 Makati.

Gomez hosted the Philippine edition of Family Feud on GMA Network. 
He is a GMA Network contract artist under GMA Artist Center.

After his movie Filipinas in 2003, Gomez made a comeback in the indie film Bente which starred Senator Jinggoy Estrada and Iza Calzado. He briefly returned to GMA Network in the weekly drama anthology, Claudine, and returned to the Kapatid Network The 5 Network after 17 years by hosting the weekend variety show, P.O.5.. He appeared in the drama show, My Driver Sweet Lover, and Mga Nagbabagang Bulaklak. Gomez was part of the teleseries Walang Hanggan from January 16, 2012. He co-hosted The Biggest Game Show In The World (Asia) with Joey de Leon, and appeared in the comedy-drama, Madam Chairman. In 2015, he starred in the mystery drama You're My Home with Dawn Zulueta and an ensemble cast.

Aside from his native tongue Tagalog, Gomez is also fluent in English and Cebuano.

Education
He graduated from the University of the Philippines Open University (Associate in Arts, 2009) and the University of Perpetual Help System DALTA (Masters in Business Administration, 2016). He earned a doctorate in public administration from the Cebu Technological University in 2019.

Political career
Gomez was a nominee of Mamamayan Ayaw sa Droga (MAD) Partylist in the Congressional election of 2001. Their party won but was disqualified for failing to present proof of sectoral representation. He planned to run as governor of Bulacan province  but, lacking the residency requirements, ran instead as an independent in the 2007 Senatorial elections which he lost.

In 2010, he ran for a seat in the Congress for the 4th district of Leyte but was disqualified by the Commission on Elections (Comelec) for failing to establish residency in Ormoc City. His wife, Lucy Torres-Gomez, took his place and won. He served as his wife's chief of staff during her term as congresswoman.

In 2013, he ran for mayor of Ormoc City but lost. He was finally elected as Mayor in 2016 and was reelected in 2019.

He ran for a seat in the Congress for the 4th district of Leyte in 2022, switching places with his wife and eventually won.

Filmography

Films
1984
Hindi Mo Ako Kayang Tapakan - Jun
1985
Naked Paradise
Inday Bote - Edward Salameda
Mga Kwento ni Lola Basyang ("Zombie" segment) - Zombie
I Can't Stop Loving You - Alvin Laurel
1986
Yesterday, Today and Tomorrow
Blusang Itim - Angelo
When I Fall in Love - Dong
Balimbing: Mga Taong Hunyango
Paalam...Bukas ang Kasal Ko - Paul Raymundo
Super Islaw and the Flying Kids - Islaw/Super Islaw
Nasaan Ka Nang Kailangan Kita - Dinky
Tuklaw
1987
Once Upon a Time - Rommel
Tagos ng Dugo - Pepito
Forward March - Danny
Ibigay Mo sa Akin ang Bukas
Kid, Huwag Kang Susuko - Cesar 'Shawie' Arroyo
Paano Kung Wala Ka Na - Sonny
Kumander Gringa
1988
Fly Me to the Moon - Prinsipe Dax
Stupid Cupid ("Forever My Love" segment) - Ruel
Nasaan Ka Inay - Donald
Buy One, Take One
Nagbabagang Luha - Bien
Sa Akin Pa Rin ang Bukas
Lamat sa Kristal (TV movie)
Babaing Hampaslupa - Jimmy
1989
Kailan Mahuhusgahan ang Kasalanan - Robert Quintana
Kahit Wala Ka Na - Patrick
Impaktita - Rudy
Eastwood & Bronson: Palibhasa Detektib - Eastwood
Rape of Virginia P.
Isang Araw Walang Diyos - Lt.Cary Altamonte
Rosenda - Efren
1990
Dyesebel - Edward
Nagsimula sa Puso - Carlo
Hanggang Saan ang Tapang Mo - Ruben Alejandro
Kapag Langit ang Humatol - Hector
Iputok Mo... Dadapa Ako! (Hard to Die) - Tricycle driver
Lover's Delight - Machete
Shake, Rattle & Roll II ("Aswang" segment) - Tricycle Driver
1991
I Want to Live
Para sa Iyo ang Huling Bala Ko - Quintin
Hihintayin Kita sa Langit - Gabriel
Buburahin Kita sa Mundo - Rodel Segovia
1992
Your Dream Is Mine
True Confessions (Evelyn, Myrna & Maggie)
Lumayo Ka Nga sa Akin - Raul
Ikaw ang Lahat sa Akin - Cesar
Iisa Pa Lamang - Arman
Buddy en Sol (Sine Ito)
Ang Siga at ang Sosyal
Paminsan-minsan
Ngayon at Kailanman - Edwin Torres
Ikaw Pala ang Minahal - David
1993
Saan Ka Man Naroroon - Miguel
1994
Wating - Ardo
Bakit Pa Kita Minahal - Teddy
Maalaala Mo Kaya: The Movie - Mike
Sana'y Mapatawad Mo - Bong
Kapantay ay Langit - Steve
1995
Eskapo - Sergio Osmeña III
Sa'yo Lamang - Andrew
Dahas - Jake
1997
Kahit Kailan
Hanggang Kailan Kita Mamahalin - Mike Reyes 
1998
Walang Katumbas ang Dugo
Ang Babae sa Bintana - Mitch
1999
Linlang - Lance
2000
Minsan Minahal Kita - Albert Simone
2002
Ikaw Lamang Hanggang Ngayon - Ryan
Mano Po - Raf
2003
Walang Kapalit - Dennis Rustia
Filipinas - Samuel Filipinas
2006
Eternity - Fencing Instructor
2009
Bente - Roman
2013
Sonata with Cherie Gil
2014
She's Dating the Gangster - Old Kenji
The Janitor with Dennis Trillo
The Trial - Julian Bien
2015
The Love Affair - Vince Ramos
2016
Love Me Tomorrow - cameo
2018
Three Words to Forever - Rick Andrada

Television

Awards and nominations

Film
FAMAS  Award for Best Actor for The Love Affair (nominee)
 Gawad TANGLAW Awards 2015 for Best Supporting Actor for The Trial 
 17th Gawad PASADO Awards 2015 for PinakaPASADOng Katuwang na Aktor for The Trial 
FAMAS Award for Best Actor for Filipinas (nominee)
FAMAS Award for Best Actor for Dahas 
FAP Award for Best Actor for Dahas (tied with Fernando Poe Jr. for Kahit Butas ng Karayom)
Gawad Urian Award for Best Actor for Dahas (nominee)
Gawad Urian Award for Best Actor for Waiting
Gawad Urian Award for Best Actor for Ikaw Ang Lahat Sa Akin (nominee)
Gawad Urian Award for Best Actor for Saan Ka Man Naroroon
Gawad Urian Award for Best Actor for Nagsimula sa Puso (nominee)
Gawad Urian Award for Best Actor for Hihintayin Kita Sa Langit
Metro Manila Film Festival 2003 for People's Choice Awards for Best Actor for Filipinas
Metro Manila Film Festival 1995 for Best Actor for Dahas
Star Awards for Movies: Actor of the Year for Dahas (1996)

Television
23rd PMPC Star Awards for TV Best Game Show Host for Family Feud (Philippine Edition)
26th PMPC Star Awards for TV Best Drama Actor for Walang Hanggan (nominee)
Golden Screen TV Awards 2013 Outstanding Performance by an Actor in a Drama Series for Walang Hanggan
30th PMPC Star Awards for TV Best Drama Actor for You're My Home (nominee)

Sports
2005 Southeast Asian Games for fencing (Men's Team Épée) - Gold Medalist

Others
Metro Manila Film Festival 2011 for Ellen Lising Male Face of the Night
GMMSF Box-Office Entertainment Awards 2013 for All Time Favorite Love Team on Movies and TV (with Dawn Zulueta)

References

External links
 
 Richard, Lucy Gomez celebrate tenth wedding anniversary, 05/02/2008

1966 births
Living people
20th-century Filipino male actors
21st-century Filipino male actors
ABS-CBN personalities
Asian Games competitors for the Philippines
Competitors at the 2005 Southeast Asian Games
Fencers at the 1998 Asian Games
Fencers at the 2002 Asian Games

Filipino male comedians
Filipino male épée fencers
Filipino male film actors
Filipino male models
Filipino male television actors
Filipino television directors
GMA Network personalities
Independent politicians in the Philippines
Liberal Party (Philippines) politicians
Male actors from Cebu
Male actors from Manila
People from Cebu
People from Ormoc
Southeast Asian Games gold medalists for the Philippines
Southeast Asian Games competitors for the Philippines
Southeast Asian Games medalists in fencing
TV5 (Philippine TV network) personalities
University of the Philippines Open University alumni
University of Perpetual Help System DALTA alumni
Filipino actor-politicians